Magaluf is a major holiday resort on the Spanish island of Majorca, primarily catering to the British, Russian, Irish, German, and Scandinavian package holiday market. Magaluf is in the municipality of Calvià and is situated within a group of towns, primarily Torrenova and Palma Nova.

Resort
Magaluf is part of the municipality of Calvià and is located within a group of towns which includes Palma Nova and Torrenova. The resort caters to young (mainly British) adults and couples as well as families, with peak season during July and August. During the winter season (November through March), the population of Magaluf consists primarily of local residents, with most resort and package-based hotels closing their doors. The Palma Nova resort is located just north of Magaluf and is approximately a five-minute drive from the centre of Magaluf.

Magaluf consists of a white sandy beach and the Magaluf strip, which is the centre for the main nightlife and restaurants. Meliá Hotels International started the required investment for the first stage in modernising the resort of Magaluf, by updating four hotels on the beach front, known as the Calvià Beach Resort, which opened in June 2012.

A popular challenge for tourists is a swim to Black Lizard Island (Isla de sa Porrassa) located in the centre of Magaluf Bay. The island is known by this name due to the very high number of black lizards that can be found scurrying away during one's climb. The island is situated right in the centre of Magaluf's bay and is approximately 400 m away from the beach front.

Nightlife

There are many bars and nightclubs in Magaluf, and many DJs have played at the resort, including David Guetta, DJ Sammy, Freemasons, Basshunter, Judge Jules, Tiësto, Pat Sharp, Calvin Harris, Tim Westwood, Greg James, Martin Garrix and Lauren Pope. Night-life in Magaluf is centred on the Punta Balena strip, where most of the nightclubs and bars are located.

Controversy

The resort focuses almost exclusively on British binge drinking tourism, with extremely low alcohol and fast food (fish and chips) prices, and British staffed medical emergency centres located close to bar areas.

British tour operators have warned the Spanish Tourist Board that the image of Magaluf is affecting their efforts to market Mallorca. It is commonly called 'Shagaluf' in popular British culture.

Magaluf in popular culture
Swedish pop musician Orup sang about the resort in 1992 in the song "Magaluf".
English punk band Toy Dolls wrote a song called "I've Had Enough o' Magaluf".
 Belgian musician Maarten Devoldere clip "Mad World" has been one-shot in Magaluf.

References

External links

 Magaluf Events
 Magaluf News
 Magaluf Stag and Hen Company
 Local Government
  Magaluf Travel Guide
 Magaluf Beach Guide

Entertainment districts in Spain
Populated places in Calvià
Populated coastal places in Spain
Seaside resorts in Spain